Arabica FC Kirundo, is an African football (soccer) club from Burundi.

The team is based in Kirundo Province in northern Burundi and plays in the Second Division.

Honours

Performance in CAF competitions
2001 CAF Cup: 1 appearance First round

References

Football clubs in Burundi